The Bishop of Llandaff is the ordinary of the Church in Wales Diocese of Llandaff.

Area of authority
The diocese covers most of the County of Glamorgan. The bishop's seat is in the Cathedral Church of Saint Peter and Saint Paul (the site of a church traditionally said to have been founded in 560 by Saint Teilo), in the village of Llandaff, just north-west of the City of Cardiff. The bishop's residence is Llys Esgob, The Cathedral Green, Llandaff, in Cardiff.

Brief history
The controversial Iolo Manuscripts claim an older foundation dating to Saints Dyfan and Fagan, said elsewhere to have missionized the court of King Lucius of Britain on behalf of Pope Eleutherius around AD 166. The manuscripts—others of which are original and others now known forgeries—list Dyfan as the first bishop and, following his martyrdom, Fagan as his successor. Baring-Gould refers to them as chorepiscopi. The present-day St Fagans (referenced in the manuscripts as "Llanffagan Fawr") is now a village near Cardiff.

Originally Celtic Christians, the bishops were in full communion with the Roman Catholic Church from 777 until the Reformation. In AD 914, the Danes ravaged Archenfield, according to the Anglo-Saxon Chronicle (AD 915, Worcester Manuscript, p. 99). The jarls leading the raids, Ohtor and Hroald, captured the bishop; he was later ransomed. The jarls were killed in a subsequent battle at "Killdane Field" (or "Kill Dane") in Weston-under-Penyard and the raiders were subdued.

The first evidence that the bishops were called Bishop of Llandaff is from the early 11th century. Before this, though still ministering to Glamorgan and Gwent, the bishops described themselves as Bishop of Teilo and were almost certainly based at Llandeilo Abbey. The very early bishops were probably based in Ergyng. Before 1107, the title Bishop of Gwlad Morgan (Glamorgan) had been adopted. In medieval records, the bishop was sometimes referred to as the Archbishop of Llandaff. This appears to have been a simple reaction to the claim of St David's to the archiepiscopal title.

In 1534, the church in England and Wales broke allegiance with the Roman Catholic Church and established the Church of England. After a brief restoration with the Holy See during the reign of Queen Mary I, the Welsh dioceses remained part of the Anglican Province of Canterbury from the reign of Queen Elizabeth I until the early 20th century. Following the passing of the Welsh Church Act 1914, the church in Wales and Monmouthshire was disestablished and the independent Church in Wales was created on 31 March 1920. The bishopric and diocese of Llandaff now constitute part of the Church in Wales within the wider Anglican Communion.

In 1924, the Dahlia 'Bishop of Llandaff' was named after Joshua Pritchard Hughes, who was bishop from 1905 to 1931.

A long-serving recent bishop of Llandaff was Barry Morgan; when elected as bishop in 1999 his official signature was Barry Landav, but once elected Archbishop of Wales in 2003 his archiepiscopal signature Barry Cambrensis took precedence. He was supported by David Wilbourne, assistant bishop of Llandaff from 2009 to 2017.

Following June Osborne's retirement, on 19 January 2023, it was announced that Mary Stallard, Assistant Bishop of Bangor, had been elected that day by the Electoral College of the Church in Wales at Llandaff Cathedral to become the next diocesan Bishop of Llandaff. She will legally take up her See as of the Sacred Synod to confirm her election; this is scheduled for April 2023.

List of bishops
(Dates in italics indicate de facto continuation of office.)

Pre-Reformation

Diocese of 'Glamorgan and Gwent' – Traditional list

Diocese of Llandaff

During the Reformation

Post-Reformation

Bishops of the Church of England

Bishops of the disestablished Church in Wales

Assistant bishops
Among those non-retired bishops who have assisted the bishops of Llandaff have been:
2 June 191730 April 1921 (ret.): Lloyd Crossley, Rector of St Andrew's Major and former bishop of Auckland
19611970 (ret.): Thomas Hughes, Archdeacon of Margam (until 1965), then Archdeacon of Llandaff (until 1969)
19751976 (res.): John Poole Hughes, Curate at Llantwit Major and previously Bishop of South-West Tanganyika; became diocesan bishop of Llandaff
19771983 (ret.): David Reece, Archdeacon of Margam (until 1981)
20042009 (ret.): David Yeoman, Archdeacon of Morgannwg (until 2006)
20092017 (ret.): David Wilbourne

Citations

References

 
 
 
 
 
 
 
 
 
 
 
 

 
Llandaff
Bishop of Llandaff
Llandaff
Llandaff